Idan Yaniv (born  October 18, 1986) is an Israeli singer born in Tel Aviv.
He has successfully recorded five albums with many popular singles. His debut single was "Hoshev Aleha" and it was a hit that generated a lot of attention in Israel and in other Jewish communities in the world. Also, he recorded a duet with famous pop singer Dana International named Seret Hodi ("Movie from India"), and its video reached the top video charts, making it the most requested videoclip in the history of Israel so far. Idan Yaniv became the 2007 Artist of the Year in Israel.

Discography

References

External links
Official website 

21st-century Israeli male singers
Bukharan Jews
Israeli people of Indian-Jewish descent
1986 births
Living people
Mizrahi singers